In Greek mythology, Pyraechmes was, along with Asteropaeus, a leader of the Paeonians in the Trojan War.

Mythology 
Pyraechmes came from the city of Amydon.  Although Homer mentions Pyraechmes as the leader of the Paeonians early on in the Iliad, in the Trojan Catalogue, Pyraechmes plays a minor role compared to the more illustrious Asteropaeus, a later arrival to the front.  Unlike Asteropaeus, Homer does not provide a pedigree for Pyraechmes (although Dictys Cretensis says his father was Axius - also the name of a river in Paeonia).  Pyraechmes was killed in battle by Patroclus: dressed in Achilles' armor, Patroclus routed the panicked Trojans, and the first person he killed was Pyraechmes.

References
Dictionary of Greek and Roman Biography and Mythology

People of the Trojan War
Paeonian people

Paeonian mythology